

Otto Kohlermann (17 February 1896 – 27 February 1984) was a German general (Generalleutnant) in the Wehrmacht during World War II. He was a recipient of the Knight's Cross of the Iron Cross of Nazi Germany.

Awards

 Knight's Cross of the Iron Cross on 22 February 1942 as Oberst and commander of ARKO 129

References

Citations

Bibliography

 
 

1896 births
1984 deaths
Military personnel from Magdeburg
Lieutenant generals of the German Army (Wehrmacht)
German Army personnel of World War I
Recipients of the clasp to the Iron Cross, 1st class
Recipients of the Knight's Cross of the Iron Cross
People from the Province of Saxony
German Army generals of World War II